The Norway national under-17 football team, controlled by the Football Association of Norway, is the national under-17 football team of Norway.

History
The team is for players of 17 years  or under at the start of a UEFA European Under-17 Championship campaign.
Norway have qualified for the 2017 UEFA European Under-17 Championship & 2018 UEFA European Under-17 Championship.

Competitive results

FIFA U-16/17 World Cup record

UEFA European U-17 Championship record

Current squad 
 The following players were called up for the 2023 UEFA European Under-17 Championship qualification matches.
 Match dates: 20–26 October 2022
 Opposition: ,  and 
Caps and goals correct as of: 23 October 2022, after the match against

References 

European national under-17 association football teams
under-17